NWF Kids Pro Wrestling: The Untold Story is a professional wrestling documentary that tells the story of a youth based professional wrestling league that existed in the mid-1980s. It was released in the United States by NWF Films.

Synopsis
The documentary (84 min) covers the birth and development of a professional style wrestling league from the mid-1980s that was produced by young teens aging from 12 to 16 years of age. The film covers the rise and fall of a unique wrestling experience for both the fans and kids that were involved.  The film includes footage from the original NWF productions as well as current interviews with past NWF participants.

Cast
Interviewed for the film were Charley Lane, Michael Ackermann, Matt Kelsey, Chris Hanson, Jason Clauson, John Hoffman, and Leslie Johnson

Reception

Internet wrestling reviewer Brian Zane reviewed the documentary and called it fascinating though he found the lack of interviews with the kids parents disappointing.

Awards & nominations
Since the film was released on DVD in October, 2005, It has received 13 national and international awards. Among these are: 
2005, won Best Sports Documentary Award at New York International Independent Film & Video Festival
2006, won ScreenCraft Award for Best Feature Documentary at New York International Independent Film & Video Festival
2006, won Aegis Award at Aegis Film and Television competition
2006, won Accolade Award honorable mention at Accolade Competition
2006, won 2 silver and 1 bronze Telly Award

References

External links
 

2005 films
Professional wrestling documentary films
Documentary films about children
2005 documentary films
American documentary films
2000s English-language films
2000s American films